NASCAR Outdoors is an outdoors television series sponsored by the National Association of Stock Car Racing (NASCAR) first broadcast on the Outdoor Life Network on April 4, 2004. Outdoor Channel began to broadcast the series in 2011, under the title Realtree's NASCAR Outdoors.

External links

2004 American television series debuts
American sports television series
English-language television shows